Abdoujapar Tagaev (Abdyjapar Abdykaarovich Tagaev; 31 March 1953 in Uzgen District – 12 January 2017) was a Kyrgyz politician who served as Minister of Communications from 1995 to 1996. Also he headed the Jalal-Abad Region.

Awards and honours
 
 Honoured Worker of Kyrgyz telecommunications
 Certificate of Honour of the Kyrgyz Republic

References 

1953 births
2017 deaths
Communication ministers of Kyrgyzstan